Zenion is a genus of zeniontid fish that is known from the fossil record, but is still extant.

Species
There are currently four recognized recent species in this genus:
 Zenion hololepis (Goode & T. H. Bean, 1896)
 Zenion japonicum Kamohara, 1934 (Japanese dory)
 Zenion leptolepis (Gilchrist & von Bonde, 1924) (elongate dory)
 Zenion longipinnis Kotthaus, 1970

References

Zeniontidae
Ray-finned fish genera
Pleistocene fish
Extant Pliocene first appearances
Taxa named by David Starr Jordan